Leonardo Genovese (born 1979) is an Argentine jazz pianist, keyboardist, and composer. He has played with The Mars Volta.

Life and career
Genovese was born in Venado Tuerto, Argentina, in 1979. He began playing the piano at the age of 5 or 6, but became more interested in playing around ten years later.

Genovese began studying music and accounting at the University of Rosario, but soon abandoned accountancy, and in 2001 he began studying at the Berklee College of Music. He graduated in 2003. His first album, Haiku II, was released the following year and was followed by Unlocked in 2008, but Genovese later talked them down, stating that they were "just a way to document where I was at the time". From 2005 he recorded and toured internationally with bassist and vocalist Esperanza Spalding.

A reviewer for The New York Times commented on Genovese's 2013 album, Seeds, that, "by refusing to privilege one historical style over another, he strengthens his claim as a polyglot". Down Beat observed that Genovese's compositions for the album "share an exploratory nature, whether the new terrain in question is a marriage of electronic and acoustic sounds, an unlikely use of chromatic scaling or the successful juxtaposition of otherwise disparate ideas."

Genovese won a Grammy Award for Best Improvised Jazz Solo for his solo on "Endangered Species" from Wayne Shorter's album Live at the Detroit Jazz Festival.

Discography
An asterisk (*) indicates that the year is that of release.

As leader/co-leader

As sideman

References

1979 births
Argentine jazz pianists
Living people
Palmetto Records artists
21st-century pianists
Omar Rodriguez Lopez Group members
Grammy Award winners